Jacob Gerrard Roddy (born 10 April 2003) is an English professional footballer who plays as a left-back for League One club Charlton Athletic.

Career
A youth product of Southampton and Bradfield College, Roddy signed with Charlton Athletic on 5 July 2021. He made his professional debut with Charlton in a 1–0 EFL Cup loss to Wimbledon on 10 August 2021. Jacob is the son of Charlton Athletic former technical director, Ged Roddy.

Career statistics

References

External links
 
 

2003 births
Living people
English footballers
Charlton Athletic F.C. players
Association football fullbacks